Noel Mason Smith (May 22, 1895 – September 20, 1955) was an American film director and writer.  He directed more than 120 films between 1917 and 1952. He was born in Rockland, California, and died in Los Angeles, California.

Selected filmography

 Tootsies and Tamales (1919)
 Healthy and Happy (1919)
 Yaps and Yokels (1919)
 Mates and Models (1919)
 Squabs and Squabbles (1919)
 Bungs and Bunglers (1919)
 Switches and Sweeties (1919)
 Dames and Dentists (1920)
 Maids and Muslin (1920)
 Squeaks and Squawks (1920)
 The Girl in the Limousine (1924)
 Her Boy Friend (1924)
 Kid Speed (1924)
 The Clash of the Wolves (1925)
 The Flying Mail (1926)
 The Night Patrol (1926)
 The Merry Cavalier (1926)
 The Blue Streak (1926)
 Fangs of Justice (1926)
 The Snarl of Hate (1927)
 One Chance in a Million (1927)
 Marlie the Killer (1928)
 Fangs of Fate (1928)
 The Law's Lash (1928)
 The Bachelor's Club (1929)
 Dancing Dynamite (1931)
 Scareheads (1931)
 The Fighting Pilot (1935)
 California Mail (1936)
 Code of the Secret Service (1939)
 On Dress Parade (1939)
 Secret Service of the Air (1939)
 The Nurse's Secret (1941)
 Cattle Town (1952)

References

External links

1895 births
1955 deaths
American male screenwriters
Film directors from California
People from Del Norte County, California
Screenwriters from California
20th-century American male writers
20th-century American screenwriters